Paul Vaughn is an American television actor. He is known for playing the recurring role of "Paul" on ten episodes of the American sitcom television series Cheers. Vaughn guest-starred in television programs including Fantasy Island, Cannon and I Dream of Jeannie. He also appeared in the television film Three's a Crowd as Oscar Preeble.

Filmography

Television

References

External links 

Rotten Tomatoes profile

American male television actors
Possibly living people
Year of birth missing (living people)
20th-century American male actors